Giuseppe "Beppe" Greco (born 6 August 1983) is an Italian former professional footballer who played as a striker.

Career

Early career
Greco was born in Palermo, but moved to Pizzoli, L'Aquila at a young age. He began to play youth football at local club Amiternina. At age 16 he moved to the Pavia youth academy and then, for one year, he was enrolled in the Sampdoria youth teams.

Professional career
He returned to Pavia where he would start his senior career, later playing for Como. He made his Serie A debut on 3 May 2003, against Milan, coming on as a 51st-minute substitute for Luigi Anaclerio in a 0–2 away loss at San Siro. He was signed by Sampdoria city rival Genoa in summer 2003, after former Como owner Enrico Preziosi took over Genoa, but he was loaned back to Como and then to Padova.

He returned to Genoa in Serie C1, and left on loan to Catanzaro of Serie B in January 2006. He helped Genoa to win promotion to Serie A in summer 2007, but he then left on loan to Chievo and Rimini. On 28 January 2010, Genoa loaned the forward to Cesena until the end of the season. After his return to Genoa they loaned him to Grosseto in Serie B in the summer of 2010 where he played 10 games and scored 1 goal. However, in early 2011 he was loaned out again to Modena also in Serie B where he scored 8 goals in 17 games.

In January 2013, Greco moved to Pro Vercelli, with whom he won a promotion to Serie B. The following year he signed with Venezia, competing in Serie C.

On 25 June 2015, he joined FeralpiSalò, signing a one-year contract. Halfway through the season, on 29 January 2016, he moved to Arezzo, where he made his debut the following day and immediately proved to be decisive in a 4–0 win over Tuttocuoio. In the game, he scored two goals in the first five minutes as well as providing an assist.

Later career
Then followed seasons in lower-league football for teams in Emilia-Romagna. On 9 June 2016, Greco moved to Castelvetro, a team from the Province of Modena recently promoted to Serie D. The following season he joined fifth-tier Eccellenza club Rosselli Mutina, before moving to Axys Zola from Zola Predosa, newly promoted to Serie D, and in June 2019 he signed for Castellarano, competing in Promozione, the sixth tier of the Italian football pyramid. Short stints then followed Virtus Camposanto and Sanmichelese in 2020.

References

External links
 gazzetta.it

1983 births
Footballers from Palermo
Living people
Association football forwards
Italian footballers
U.C. Sampdoria players
F.C. Pavia players
Como 1907 players
Genoa C.F.C. players
Calcio Padova players
U.S. Catanzaro 1929 players
A.C. ChievoVerona players
Rimini F.C. 1912 players
Pisa S.C. players
S.S.C. Bari players
A.C. Cesena players
F.C. Grosseto S.S.D. players
Modena F.C. players
F.C. Pro Vercelli 1892 players
Venezia F.C. players
FeralpiSalò players
S.S. Arezzo players
S.S.D. Axys Zola players
Serie A players
Serie B players
Serie C players
Serie D players